A tambour desk is  a desk with desktop-based drawers and pigeonholes, in a way resembling bureau à gradin.  The small drawers and nooks are covered, when required, by reeded or slatted shutters, tambours, which usually retract in the two sides, left and right.  It is a flatter and "sideways" version of the rolltop desk.

Unlike the rolltop desk, the tambour desk uses straight, perfectly vertical rows of shutters, and the work surface rests on a few drawers, which in turn are supported by short legs instead of pedestals.  In addition, half of the desktop folds back on itself when not in use.  The desktop is supported by sliders, like a secretary desk or a slant top desk when it is unfolded.

The tambour desk is an antique form indigenous to the United States of America and should not be confused with the British tambour writing table.

See also
List of desk forms and types.

References
Gloag, John. A Complete Dictionary of Furniture.  Woodstock, N.Y.: Overlook Press, 1991.

External links

Desks
History of furniture